Hynninen is a Finnish surname. Notable people with the surname include:

Eero Hynninen (born 1953), Finnish sprint canoeist
Helka Hynninen (born 1930), Finnish singer and songwriter
Jorma Hynninen (born 1941), Finnish opera singer
Onni Hynninen (1910–2001), Finnish sport shooter
Paavo Hynninen (1883–1960), Finnish diplomat

Finnish-language surnames